Mark Browne is a former Canadian politician, who served in the Newfoundland and Labrador House of Assembly from 2015 until his defeat in the 2019 election. He represented the electoral district of Placentia West-Bellevue as a member of the Liberal Party.

He previously served as an assistant to federal MP Judy Foote, and as a political assistant in the Office of the Official Opposition.

During his term as MHA he served as parliamentary assistant to Premier Dwight Ball.

References

Living people
Liberal Party of Newfoundland and Labrador MHAs
21st-century Canadian politicians
1993 births